Nina Stojanović and You Xiaodi were the defending champions, but both players chose to compete with different partners. You chose to compete with Lu Jingjing but lost in the first round to Ingrid Neel and Anastasia Pivovarova.

Stojanović played alongside Jacqueline Cako and successfully defended her title after defeating Shuko Aoyama and Yang Zhaoxuan 6–4, 6–2 in the final.

Seeds

Draw

References
Main Draw

Shenzhen Longhua Open - Doubles